Henry Frederick, Prince of Wales  (19 February 1594 – 6 November 1612), was the eldest son and heir apparent of James VI and I, King of England and Scotland; and his wife Anne of Denmark. His name derives from his grandfathers: Henry Stuart, Lord Darnley; and Frederick II of Denmark. Prince Henry was widely seen as a bright and promising heir to his father's thrones. However, at the age of 18, he predeceased his father when he died of typhoid fever. His younger brother Charles succeeded him as heir apparent to the English, Irish, and Scottish thrones.

Early life
Henry was born at Stirling Castle, Scotland, and became Duke of Rothesay, Earl of Carrick, Baron of Renfrew, Lord of the Isles, and Prince and Great Steward of Scotland automatically on his birth. His nurses included Mistress Primrose and Mistress Bruce. Henry's baptism on 30 August 1594 was celebrated with complex theatrical entertainments written by poet William Fowler and a ceremony in a new Chapel Royal at Stirling purpose-built by William Schaw. James VI set a tax of £100,000 for the expenses. Textiles and costume for the event were bought using Anne's dowry of £100,000 Scots which had been in the safekeeping of various towns. In the month before the baptism, there were rumours at the Scottish court that James VI was jealous of Anne of Denmark and thought that the Duke of Lennox might be the father of Prince Henry. 

His father placed him in the care of John Erskine, Earl of Mar, and his mother Annabell Murray, at Stirling Castle, out of the care of the boy's mother. James VI worried that the mother's tendency toward Catholicism might affect the son. The child's removal to Stirling caused enormous tension between Anne and James, and Henry remained there under the care of Mar's family until 1603. James VI wrote a note to the Earl of Mar in June 1595 instructing him, in the event of his death, not to deliver Henry to Anne of Denmark or the Parliament of Scotland until he was 18 and gave the order himself.

James VI frequently visited the Prince at Stirling. As early as August 1595 he encouraged the infant to hold a pen and make a penstroke on a document, which the king humorously certified, "I will testify this is the prince's own mark". At this time, the Master of Gray was keeper of Henry's wardrobe, and took delivery of a little coffer worth £8 Scots for the Prince's clothes. Adam Newton became his schoolmaster or tutor. William Keith of Delny and then George Lauder were his legal tutors, administrators of his estates and incomes. Anne of Denmark was reluctant to go to Stirling and was said to be afraid that her enemies would give her a poisoned posset at the Castle.

In 1596 Queen Elizabeth, via the Earl of Essex, and his secretary Anthony Bacon, sent her miniature portrait by Nicholas Hilliard to Prince Henry, and this was received by the Earl of Mar at Stirling.  It was said that Prince Henry would be godfather to his younger brother Duke Robert, in May 1602, and afterwards stay at Dunfermline Palace with his mother, but James VI forbade this. In 1602 a visit to his mother at Falkland Palace was planned, but was postponed because of her sickness. The French ambassador in London Christophe de Harlay, Count of Beaumont, reported a rumour, spread by James's friends, that Anne of Denmark was cruel and ambitious, and hoped to rule Scotland as Regent or Governor for Henry after the death of her husband.

London
James became King of England in 1603 at the Union of the Crowns and his family moved south. Anne of Denmark came to Stirling to collect her son, and after an argument with the Prince's keepers, Marie Stewart, Countess of Mar and the Master of Mar, was allowed to take Henry to Edinburgh on 28 May. On the following Sunday she took him to St Giles Kirk in her famous silver coach, and they subsequently travelled to England.

Henry's tutor Adam Newton continued to serve the Prince, and several Scottish servants from the Stirling household were retained, including the poet David Murray. The prince was lodged at Oatlands and Nonsuch Palace, and was relocated to Winchester during an outbreak of plague. At Winchester, in September 1603, Anne of Denmark produced a masque to welcome her son, which was controversial. In November 1603 he was staying at Wilton House, and King James joked that a letter presented to Henry by the Venetian diplomats was bigger than he was. Henry rode with the Earl of Nottingham and his governor Sir Thomas Chaloner to Salisbury to dine with the Venetian ambassador Nicolò Molin and other diplomats. This was the first time he had made an appearance and dined outside the royal household, and his father joked that Henry was the ambassador's prisoner.

On 15 March 1604, Henry rode on horseback behind his father through the streets of London during the delayed Royal Entry. From 1604 onwards, Henry often stayed at St James's Palace. The gardens were improved for him by Alphonsus Fowle. The daily expenses of the Prince in England were managed by the Cofferer of the Household, Henry Cocke and after 1610 David Foulis. David Murray of Gorthy was keeper of the Prince's privy purse and his accounts reveal some details of Henry's interests.

Two Scottish tailors, Alexander Wilson and Patrick Black, moved to London and made the prince's clothes. Wilson made him doublets and hose from cloth supplied by Robert Grigge, and a hunting coat of green chamlet lined with velvet. The prince was supplied with perfumed gloves made of stag's leather, perfumed gloves from Córdoba, and embroidered waistcoats "wrought very curiously in colour silks".

Music, games and sports
Prince Henry was introduced to a variety of sports at Stirling Castle. In September 1600 he was bought two golf clubs, two staffs, and four rackets. The handles were covered with velvet and dressed with metal passementerie. In September 1601, an English visitor, Thomas Musgrave, saw Henry dance, leap, and wield a pike. On Sunday 8 May 1603 Henry exercised in the castle garden, watched by his mother, played billiards after dinner, and after supper "ran and played at the boards".

In England, Henry was tutored in music by Alfonso Ferrabosco the younger, Nicholas Villiard, and Walter Quinn. Thomas Giles taught him to dance. Charles Guerolt taught him the "science of defence", fencing. At Oatlands in 1603 Prince Henry told Scaramelli, a Venetian diplomat, about his interests in dancing, tennis and hunting. In August 1604 Henry danced for the Spanish envoy, the Constable Velasco, and showed him military pike exercises in the palace garden.

In 1606 the French ambassador Antoine Lefèvre de la Boderie noted that Prince Henry played golf, which he described as a Scottish game not unlike "pallemail" or pall-mall. One of Prince Henry's biographers, "W. H.", mentioned that Henry nearly hit Adam Newton with a golf ball, and Henry said that would have paid him back. Henry also played tennis, and in July 1606 played with his uncle Christian IV of Denmark at Greenwich Palace. He had a court for "pall-mall", laid out at St James's Fields, north of St James's Palace. It was a long alley surfaced with cockle shells crushed into clay or loam.

In 1607 Henry sought permission to learn to swim, but the Earls of Suffolk, and Shrewsbury, wrote to Newton that swimming was a "dangerous thing" that their own sons might practise "like feathers as light as things of nought", but was not suitable for Princes as "things of great weight and consequence". A riding school, one of the first in England, was built for him at St James's Palace in 1607. Henry competed at running at the ring with foreign visitors and diplomats including Louis Frederick, Duke of Württemberg-Montbéliard, in April and May 1610.

Henry talked of the merits of various breeds of horses and his own Barbary horses to the Venetian ambassador Antonio Foscarini in 1611. He revealed an interest in Venetian maritime power and had a plan of the fortification of Palmanova. As an indoor amusement, Henry played chess.

Training and personality

The king greatly preferred the role of schoolmaster to that of father, and he wrote texts for the schooling of his children. James directed that Henry's household "should rather imitate a College than a Court", or, as Sir Thomas Chaloner wrote in 1607, "His Highness's household [...] was intended by the King for a courtly college or a collegiate court" He passionately engaged in such physical pursuits as hawking, hunting, jousting and fencing, and from a young age studied naval and military affairs and national issues, about which he often disagreed with his father. He also disapproved of the way his father conducted the royal court, disliked Robert Carr, a favourite of his father, and esteemed Sir Walter Raleigh, wishing him to be released from the Tower of London.

The prince's popularity rose so high that it threatened his father. Relations between the two could be tense, and on occasion surfaced in public. At one point, they were hunting near Royston when James criticised his son for lacking enthusiasm for the chase, and initially moved to strike his son with his cane, but Henry rode off. Most of the hunting party then followed the son.

"Upright to the point of priggishness, he fined all who swore in his presence", according to Charles Carlton, a biographer of Charles I, who describes Henry as an "obdurate Protestant". In addition to the alms box to which Henry forced swearers to contribute, he made sure his household attended church services. His religious views were influenced by the clerics in his household, who came largely from a tradition of politicised Calvinism. Henry listened humbly, attentively, and regularly to the sermons preached to his household, and once told his chaplain, Richard Milbourne, that he esteemed most the preachers whose attitude suggested, "Sir, you must hear me diligently: you must have a care to observe what I say."

Henry is said to have disliked his younger brother, Charles, and to have teased him, although this derives from only one anecdote: when Charles was nine years of age, Henry snatched the hat off a bishop and put it on the younger child's head, then told his younger brother that when he became king he would make Charles Archbishop of Canterbury, and then Charles would have a long robe to hide his ugly rickety legs. Charles stamped on the cap and had to be dragged off in tears.

Investiture and leadership

With his father's accession to the throne of England in 1603, Henry at once became Duke of Cornwall. In 1610 he was further invested as Prince of Wales and Earl of Chester, thus for the first time uniting the six automatic and two traditional Scottish and English titles held by heirs-apparent to the two thrones. The ceremony of investiture was celebrated with a pageant London's Love to Prince Henry, and a masque, Tethys' Festival, during which his mother gave a sword encrusted with diamonds, intended to represent justice.

As a young man, Henry showed great promise and was beginning to be active in leadership matters. Among his activities, he was responsible for the reassignment of Sir Thomas Dale to the Virginia Company of London's struggling colony in North America. The city of Henricus in colonial Virginia was named in his honour in 1611; his name also survives in Henrico County, Virginia and Cape Henry. He was the "Supreme Protector" of the Company of Discoverers of the Northwest Passage, and a patron of Robert Harcourt's expedition to Guiana.

The Irish Gaelic lord of Inishowen, Sir Cahir O'Doherty, had applied to gain a position as a courtier in the household of Henry, to help him in his struggles against officials in Ireland. Unknown to Sir Cahir, on 19 April 1608, the day he launched O'Doherty's Rebellion by burning Derry, his application was approved. Henry took an interest in the Kingdom of Ireland and was known to be supportive of the idea of a reconciliation with the former rebel Hugh O'Neill, Earl of Tyrone, who had fled into exile during the Flight of the Earls. Because of this Tyrone and his entourage mourned when the Prince met his early death.

In 1611, King James gave Woodstock Palace in Oxfordshire to Prince Henry. Henry had a banqueting house built of leafy tree branches in the park, in which he held a dinner for his parents and his sister Princess Elizabeth. David Murray paid 110 shillings for transporting musical instruments from London to Woodstock for the event.

Death

Henry died from typhoid fever at the age of 18, during the celebrations that led up to his sister Elizabeth's wedding. (The diagnosis can be made with reasonable certainty from written records of the post-mortem examination, which was ordered to be carried out in order to dispel rumours of poisoning.) It was reported that his last words were to ask for his sister Princess Elizabeth.

After Henry's death, the prince's brother Charles fell ill, but he was the chief mourner at the funeral, which King James (who detested funerals) refused to attend. The body lay in state at St. James's Palace for four weeks. On 7 December, over a thousand people walked in the mile-long cortège to Westminster Abbey to hear a two-hour sermon delivered by George Abbot, the Archbishop of Canterbury. As Henry's body was lowered into the ground, his chief servants broke their staves of office at the grave.

Prince Henry's death was widely regarded as a tragedy for the nation. According to Charles Carlton, "Few heirs to the English throne have been as widely and deeply mourned as Prince Henry." Henry's titles of Duke of Cornwall and Duke of Rothesay passed to Charles, who until then had lived in Henry's shadow. Four years later Charles, by then 16 years old, was created Prince of Wales and Earl of Chester.

Literature and music occasioned by the prince's death

Sermons

Henry's chaplain, Daniel Price, delivered a series of sermons about the young man's death. (Price borrowed from John Donne's unrelated The first Anniversary, published in 1611, and The second Anniversary, published in 1612, for some of his language and ideas.):
 Lamentations for the death of the late illustrious Prince Henry [...] Two Sermons (1613; see 1613 in literature): "Oh, why is there not a generall thaw throughout all mankinde? why in this debashed Ayre doe not all things expire, seeing Time looks upon us with watry eues, disheveld lockes, and heavie dismall lookes; now that the Sunne is gone out of our Firmament, the ioy, the beautie, the glory of Israel is departed?"
 Spirituall Odours to the Memory of Prince Henry. In Four of the Last Sermons Preached in St James after his Highnesse Death (Oxford, 1613; see 1613 in literature) From "Meditations of Consolation in our Lamentations": "[...] his body was so faire and strong that a soule might have been pleased to live an age in it [...] vertue and valor, beauty and chastity, armes and arts, met and kist in him, and his goodnesse lent so much mintage to other Princes, that if Xenophon were now to describe a Prince, Prince HENRY had been his Patterne. [...] He hath gon his Passover from death to life, where there is more grace and more capacity [...] where earthly bodies shalbe more celestiall, then man in his Innocency or Angels in their glory, for they could fall: Hee is there with those Patriarchs that have expected Christ on earth, longer than they have enjoyed him in heaven; He is with those holy Penmen of the holy spirit, they bee now his paterns, who were here his teachers [...]"
 Teares Shed over Abner. The Sermon Preached on the Sunday before the Prince his funerall in St James Chappell before the body (Oxford, (1613; see 1613 in literature): "He, He is dead, who while he lived, was a perpetuall Paradise, every season that he shewd himselfe in a perpetuall spring, eavery exercise wherein he was scene a special felicity: He, He is dead before us [...] He, He is dead; that blessed Model of heaven his face is covered till the latter day, whose shining lamps his eyes in whose light there was life to the beholders, they bee ecclipsed until the sunne give over shining. [...] He, He is dead, and now yee see this [...]"

Prose memorials

Price also wrote two prose "Anniversaries" on the death:
 Prince Henry His First Anniversary (Oxford, 1613; see 1613 in literature): "in HIM, a glimmering light of the Golden times appeare, all lines of expectation met in this Center, all spirits of vertue, scattered into others were extracted into him [...]"
 Another "Anniversary", published in 1614

Verses
Within a few months of the prince's death, at least 32 poets had versified on it. In addition to those listed below, the writers included Sir Walter Raleigh (a friend), John Donne, Edward Herbert, Thomas Heywood and Henry King.

These poems were published in 1612 (see 1612 in poetry):
 Sir William Alexander, An Elegie on the Death of Prince Henrie
 Joshua Sylvester, Lachrimae Lachrimarum; or, The Distillation of Teares Shede for the Untimely Death of the Incomparable Prince Panaretus, also includes poems in English, French, Latin and Italian by Walter Quin
 George Wither, Prince Henries Obsequies; or, Mournefull Elegies Upon his Death

These poems and songs were published in 1613 (see 1613 in poetry):
 Thomas Campion, Songs of Mourning: Bewailing the Untimely Death of Prince Henry, verse and music; music by Giovanni Coperario (or "Copario"), said to have been John Cooper, an Englishman
 George Chapman, An Epicede or Funerall Song, On the Most Disastrous Death, of the Highborne Prince of Men, Henry Prince of Wales, &c., the work states "1612" but was published in 1613
 John Davies, The Muses-Teares for the Losse of their Hope
 William Drummond of Hawthornden, Tears on the Death of Moeliades
 Mary Oxley, or Oxlie, a Scottish poetess living in Morpeth, wrote a response to William Drummond of Hawthornden's Moeliades, which was published in 1656.

Music

In addition to the above verse-setting by Coperario, both Thomas Tomkins and Thomas Weelkes composed settings of "When David heard", a Biblical passage in which King David laments the loss of his son Absalom in battle; it is thought that both settings were directly inspired by the death of the prince.

The Oxford Dictionary of National Biography refers to a mourning song in memory of Prince Henry by John Ward remaining unpublished during the composer's lifetime; however, a "newly composed" song on the same subject was included in his First Set of Madrigals (1613).

Titles, styles, honours and arms

Titles
 19 February 1594 – 6 November 1612: The Duke of Rothesay (Earl of Carrick, Baron of Renfrew, Lord of the Isles, Prince and Great Steward of Scotland))
 24 March 1603 – 6 November 1612: The Duke of Cornwall
 4 June 1610 – 6 November 1612: The Prince of Wales (Earl of Chester, Duke of Cornwall and Rothesay, Earl of Carrick, Baron of Renfrew, Lord of the Isles, Prince and Great Steward of Scotland)

Honours
 KG: Knight of the Garter, 14 June 1603

Arms
Henry Frederick as Prince of Wales bore the arms of the kingdom, differenced by a label of three points argent.

Ancestry

References

Bibliography

External links
 A poem by Andrew Melville on the birth of Prince Henry, 'Principis Scoto-Britannorum natalia' (1594), Bridging the Continental Divide, University of Glasgow

|-

|-

|-

1594 births
1612 deaths
1594 in Scotland
16th-century Scottish people
17th-century Scottish people
16th-century Scottish peers
17th-century Scottish peers
17th-century English nobility
Heirs to the English throne
Heirs to the Scottish throne
House of Stuart
Princes of England
Princes of Scotland
Heirs apparent who never acceded
Princes of Wales
Dukes of Cornwall
Dukes of Rothesay
Knights of the Garter
People from Stirling
Deaths from typhoid fever
Infectious disease deaths in England
High Stewards of Scotland
Children of James VI and I
Burials at Westminster Abbey
People of Stirling Castle
Sons of kings